Neutral monism is an umbrella term for a class of metaphysical theories in the philosophy of mind. These theories reject the dichotomy of mind and matter, believing the fundamental nature of reality to be neither mental nor physical; in other words it is "neutral".

Relations to other theories

Physicalists believe reality is fundamentally material, idealists believe reality is fundamentally mental, dualists believe reality consists of both fundamentally mental and fundamentally physical elements, and neutral monists believe reality consists of elements that are neither fundamentally physical nor mental.

Monism

Neutral monism largely overlaps with dual-aspect theory. However, it shares little in common with other forms of monism, such as idealism and physicalism.

Dualism

Neutral monism is similar to dualism in that both take reality to have both mental and physical properties irreducible to one another. Unlike dualism however, neutral monism does not take these properties to be fundamental or separate from one another from any meaningful sense. Dualism takes the mind to supervene on matter, or - though this is less common - for matter to supervene on the mind. Neutral monism, in contrast, take both mind and matter to supervene on a neutral third substance. According to Baruch Spinoza, the mind and the body are dual aspects of Nature or God, which he identified as the third substance.

While schematic differences and neutral monism are quite stark, contemporary conceptions of the theories overlap in certain key areas. For instance, Chalmers (1996) maintains that the difference between neutral monism and his preferred property dualism can, at times, be mostly semantic.

Panpsychism 

Panpsychism is a class of theories that believe consciousness is ubiquitous. John Searle distinguished it from neutral monism as well as property dualism, which he identified as a form of dualism. However, some neutral monist theories are panpsychist and some panpsychist theories are neutral monist. However, the two don't always overlap. For instance, Russellian monism is not panpsychism in response to the combination problem. Conversely, some versions of property dualism are panpsychist, but not neutral monistic.

History

Antecedents 
Baruch Spinoza and David Hume provided accounts of reality that may be interpreted as neutral monism. Spinoza's metaphysics in Ethics argues for a monistic worldview, as well as a neutral one where body and mind are the same. H.H. Price argues that Hume's empiricism introduces a "neutral monist theory of sensation" as both "matter and mind are constructed out of sense-data".

In the late 19th century, physicist Ernst Mach theorized that physical entities are nothing apart from their perceived mental properties. Mach ultimately surmises that "both object and ego are provisional fictions of the same kind".

Early 20th century 
William James propounded the notion of radical empiricism to advance neutral monism in his essay "Does Consciousness Exist?" in 1904 (reprinted in Essays in Radical Empiricism in 1912). William James was one of the earliest philosophers to fully articulate a complete neutral monist view of the world. He did so largely in reaction to neo-Kantianism, which was prevalent at the time.

A convert of James, Bertrand Russell advocated for neutral monism, coining the term itself. Russell expressed interest in neutral monism early on his career, and officially endorsed the view from 1919 onward. He has hailed the ontology as the "supreme maxim in scientific philosophising". Russell's conception of neutral monism went through a number of iterations throughout his career. Russell's personal brand of neutral can be referred to as Russell's neutral monism or Russellian monism. It is compatible with logical atomism which was identified as Russel's earlier philosophy until he changed it into "neutral monism". His position was contentious among his contemporaries; G.E Moore maintained that Russell's philosophy was flawed due to a misinterpretation of facts (e.g. the concept of acquaintance).

Neutral monism about the mind–body relationship is described by historian C. D. Broad in The Mind and Its Place in Nature. Broad's list of possible views about the mind-body problem, which became known simply as "Broad's famous list of 1925" (see chapter XIV of Broad's book) states the basis of what this theory had been and was to become. Whately Carington in his book Matter, Mind, and Meaning (1949) advocated a form of neutral monism. He held that mind and matter both consist of the same kind of components known as "cognita" or sense data. Russian psychologist Boris Sidis also appears to have adhered to some form of neutral monism.

Present 
David Chalmers has been known to express sympathy toward neutral monism. In The Conscious Mind (1996) he concludes that facts about consciousness are "further facts about our world" and that there ought to be more to reality than just the physical. He then goes on to engage with a Platonic rendition of neutral monism that holds information as fundamental. Though Chalmers believes neutral monism and panpsychism ought to be taken seriously, he considers the combination problem to be point of concern. He considers Russell's solution of "protophenominal properties" to be ad hoc, and thinks such speculation undercuts the parsimony that made neutral monism initially appealing.

According to Stephen Stich and Ted Warfield, neutral monism has not been a popular view in philosophy as it is difficult to develop or understand the nature of the neutral elements. Nevertheless, a Machian version of the view has been defended by Jonathan Westphal in The Mind-Body Problem, 2016.

Arguments in favour 
Russell was attracted to neutral monism due to its parsimony. In his view, neutral monism offered an "immense simplification" for metaphysics. The upshot of this is that neutral monism provides a solution to the hard problem of consciousness. Annaka Harris formulated the hard problem as "how experience arises out of non-sentient matter"; the neutral monist solves the problem by arguing that if matter is neutral and contains some level of sentience, then one has perceptual contact with the world without needing to explain how experience mysteriously arises from physical matter.

An account for how this works relies on creating a distinction between extrinsic properties and intrinsic properties. Extrinsic properties are properties that exist by virtue of how they interact the world and are outwardly observable, such as structures and form. Intrinsic properties are properties exist by virtue of the way they are and are not necessarily outwardly observable. Astrophysicist Arthur Eddington notes that physics can only provide metrical indicators but tells us nothing about the intrinsic nature of things. In other words, most of the positive claims in science are related to the extrinsic properties of reality; that is, with their relationships. However, just because the intrinsic properties of matter are unknown does not mean they do not exist, and in fact may be required. As Chalmers puts it, a world of "pure causal flux" may be logically impossible, for there is "nothing for causation to relate."

Extrapolating from this, philosopher Philip Goff argues in Galileo's Error (2019) that consciousness may be the only feature of the universe that we are certain of. It cannot be seen through extrinsic signatures (as is evidenced by the problem of other minds), but we know from first-hand experience that it exists. So if (1) consciousness is the only intrinsic property of matter there is evidence for, and (2) matter must necessarily have intrinsic properties, then one can inductively infer that all matter has intrinsic conscious properties.

Arguments against 
Critics of neutral monism as a way to solve the mind-body problem cite the combination problem as its hardest problem. Neutral monism holds that micro-entities have their own form of basic, conscious experience. But accounts of how these basic experiences combine to form human consciousness remain contentious. Sam Coleman argues that this kind of subject-summing must be incoherent as subjects necessarily have viewpoints that exclude the viewpoints of other subjects; that is, if one point of view A and another point of view B are combined to form a summative "uber-mind", then the uber-mind would have to have A's experiences without B's, and vice-versa, while still maintaining a unified experience, which is contradictory. Galen Strawson hypothesizes that there could be aspects of consciousness that currently remain unsolved which could in theory explain how subject-summing could work.

Russell has proposed the existence of protophenomenal properties as a potential solution to this problem. Critics such as David Chalmers consider this to be ad hoc. In Chalmers's formulation, protophenomenal properties can be understood as being non-phenomenal, but can become so when arranged in the right structure. However, it is unclear if this concept differs enough from standard physicalism.

Variants

Radical empiricism 
This form of neutral monism was formulated by William James. It was done mostly in response to his colleagues dismissal of its rank "among first principles". Consciousness, in William James perspective, is the epistemic foundation upon which all other knowledge rests; if an ontology is incompatible with its existence, then it is the ontology that must be dismissed, not consciousness. William James considered "the perceived and the perceiver"  to simply be two sides of the same coin.

Russellian monism 
Russellian monism most famously differs from other views of neutral monism in its proposed solution to the combination problem. Russell proposes the existence of "paraphenomenal" properties, that may give rise to consciousness when organised in a certain way.

Platonism 

Not all Platonic theories are neutral monist, but some neutral monist theories are Platonic. Platonic versions of neutral monism have become more prevalent in recent decades. Though these views vary in the details, they usually take a form similar to more common forms of radical Platonism such as the Mathematical Universe Hypothesis; the difference being that they do not see such theories as sufficient for consciousness. As Chalmers points out, information will play a crucial role in any adequate theory of consciousness as the correlations between brain states and mental states must be accounted for. So, platonic versions of neutral monism argue that information is realised both physically and phenomenologically.

Some may also find Platonism appealing thanks to its parsimony: logical truths may necessarily exist, and the mental and physical are mere consequences of this necessary existence. These theories also have the advantage of having coherently defined the neutral variable, thus having overcome what's long been a major challenge for neutral monism.

See also

 Dialectical monism
 Double aspect theory
 Monadology
 Panpsychism
 Philosophy of mind
 Unus mundus

Notes

Citations

Sources 

 
Erik C. Banks. (2014). The Realistic Empiricism of Mach, James, and Russell: Neutral Monism Reconceived. Cambridge University Press. 
Erik C. Banks. (2010). Neutral Monism Reconsidered. Philosophical Psychology 23: 173-187. 
David Chalmers (1996) The Conscious Mind: In Search of a Fundamental Theory, Oxford University Press, New York,  (Pbk.)
David Chalmers ed. (2002) Philosophy of Mind: Classical and Contemporary Readings, Oxford University Press, New York,  (pbk. : alk. paper).
Andrew Gluck (2007) Damasio's Error and Descartes' Truth: An Inquiry into Epistemology, Metaphysics, and Consciousness, University of Scranton Press, Scranton PA,  ((pb)). 
Bertrand Russell (1921) The Analysis of Mind, republished 2005 by Dover Publications, Inc., Mineola, NY,  (pbk.)

External links 
Stanford Encyclopedia of Philosophy entry



Metaphysics of mind
Monism
Theory of mind